= Magazine Appollodor =

Magazine Appollodor is a magazine published in Syria and the magazine was launched in 2007. Its editor is Assif Shahin and assistant editor is Fadi Shahin.

Appollodor magazine covers architecture, art and decoration.
